Ealdred was a medieval Bishop of Cornwall. He was consecrated between 981 and a period between 988 and 990. He died between 1002 and 1009.

In 994, King Æthelred of England removed the diocese of Cornwall from the supervision of the bishop of Crediton. The diploma granting the liberty of the diocese declares that it was written by Sigeric, archbishop of Canterbury, although it is unlikely that it was actually written by his own hand.

Citations

References

External links
 

Bishops of Cornwall
10th-century English bishops
11th-century English Roman Catholic bishops
11th-century deaths
Year of birth unknown